The 2009 FIA WTCC Race of France was the fourth round of the 2009 World Touring Car Championship season and the fifth running of the FIA WTCC Race of France. It was held on 17 May 2009 at the temporary Circuit de Pau street circuit in Pau, France. It was the headline event of the 2009 Pau Grand Prix. Both races were won by Chevrolet with Robert Huff winning race one and Alain Menu winning race two. The second race was notable for a collision between race leader Franz Engstler and the safety car at the end of the first lap.

Background
Yvan Muller had established an outright lead in the drivers' championship after the previous round in Morocco, twelve points clear of SEAT Sport teammate Gabriele Tarquini. Félix Porteiro was leading the Yokohama Independents' Trophy.

SUNRED Engineering expanded to three cars for the Pau event, Tom Coronel was joined by Tom Boardman who returned after missing the previous round and former European Touring Car Championship driver Éric Cayrolle. With both George Tanev and Vito Postiglione being forced to miss the round, Scuderia Proteam Motorsport ran just one car for independents' championship leader Porteiro. Local French GT Championship regular Laurent Cazenave joined Wiechers-Sport for the weekend alongside full-time driver Stefano D'Aste.

Report

Free practice
Jörg Müller was fastest in the first practice session, Augusto Farfus was second and Yvan Muller was third. Alain Menu was the fastest Chevrolet driver in sixth. The petrol SEAT cars were mainly faster than the SEAT Sport run diesel cars. Marin Čolak, Coronel and Boardman finished the session seventh, eighth and ninth ahead of Jordi Gené, Tiago Monteiro and Rickard Rydell.

BMW were quickest once again in free practice two, Andy Priaulx was quickest for BMW Team UK. He was ahead of morning pacesetters Müller and Farfus while Coronel in fourth was the fastest independent. Menu was fifth for Chevrolet and the fastest factory SEAT was Rydell fourteenth, one place behind the Lada of Jaap van Lagen.

Qualifying
Priaulx claimed his first pole position since the 2006 Guia Race of Macau. The BMW Team UK man was among the front runners during both practice sessions and qualifying and put in a time of 1:22.462 in Q2. He demoted BMW teammate Farfus by just 11 thousandths of a second. Coronel defied odds in taking part in Q2 after the front of his car was severely damaged in Q1. However, attention from his team and he lined up in third place.

While it was a BMW at the top of the timesheet for the majority of the Q1, on the last lap Huff and Chevrolet stormed through with a 1:22.900 stealing the quickest time away from Priaulx by 0.042 of a second. Jörg Müller (1:22.960) and Farfus (1:23.201) went into Q2 as third and fourth best. Coronel was sitting fifth at the end of Q1. However, at this time his team was repairing his car for Q2 after he incurred damage with seven minutes remaining. Leading man Huff’s teammates Larini and Menu both made the cut after claiming the sixth and seventh best times. Independent drivers Porteiro and Engstler along with Sergio Hernández made up the top ten, narrowly denying Alessandro Zanardi and D’Aste progression into Q2. All the five SEAT Sport turbodiesel cars remained out of the Q2 for the first time.

In Q2, Coronel was the man to beat for the opening half of the session after he clocked a 1:22.917. However, Farfus knocked the Dutchman off provisional pole by a sturdy four tenths of a second. The Brazilian’s time of 1:22.473 seemed good enough to set him up at the front for Race 1 until Priaulx bettered it by just 0.011 seconds. Coronel’s time secured third place on the grid alongside Jörg Müller. A trio of Chevrolets followed from fifth to seventh; Huff (1:23.097), Menu (1:23.128) and Larini (1:23.282).

Warm-Up
Pole sitter Farfus was fastest in the warm–up session on Sunday morning with Jörg Müller second and Priaulx third.

Race One
Huff took his second win in three races for Chevrolet. The Briton got a great start from third and overtook Farfus who hit some oil and went wide at Pont Oscar on lap 2. Huff led the pack for the remaining 17 laps with Farfus and Jörg Müller having to settle for second and third despite applying constant pressure on the front man. Perseverance paid out for Priaulx who crossed the line fourth, having passed Menu on lap 12.

Spaniard Hernández made good progress in the second half of the race to secure fifth place overall with fellow countryman Porteiro winning the independent category in sixth overall, however he was eventually excluded by the stewards for hitting Coronel. Engstler inherited the independents’ victory and sixth place, while Menu came home eighth to start race two on pole.

Race Two
Chevrolet achieved their fourth consecutive win and this time it was Menu on the top podium spot. He was joined by teammate Huff who crossed the line third and Farfus from BMW Team Germany took second place just as in race one. The race was suspended when Engstler collided with the safety car. During the first lap Porteiro hit Hernández with the later not being able to rejoin. Porteiro was given a drive-through penalty.

Jörg Müller and Priaulx also made contact with each other in lap one. While Priaulx continued and crossed the line fourth, Müller received a drive-through penalty for pitting during the suspension of the race and finished 18th. Zanardi stormed through the pack to achieve fifth place and SEAT Sport men Gabriele Tarquini and Yvan Muller scored points in sixth and seventh. The race ended under the red flags with one lap remaining after Cayrolle and Larini, who were battling for eighth spot, were involved in a collision.

Results

Qualifying

 — Robert Huff, Andy Priaulx, Tom Coronel, Nicola Larini, Alain Menu, Félix Porteiro and Sergio Hernández had all their times in Q2 deleted for exceeding the engine rev limit on their cars.

 — Stefano D'Aste had his four fastest lap times in Q1 deleted for exceeding the engine rev limit on his car.

 — Yvan Muller had his fastest lap time in Q1 deleted for exceeding the engine rev limit and the maximum supercharged air pressure on his car.

Race 1

Bold denotes Fastest lap.

Race 2

Bold denotes Fastest lap.

Standings after the event

Drivers' Championship standings

Yokohama Independents' Trophy standings

Manufacturers' Championship standings

 Note: Only the top five positions are included for both sets of drivers' standings.

References

External links
Results Booklet PDF at MST Systems
Collision between Engstler and Safety Car at YouTube

Race of France
France
FIA WTCC Race of France
Pau Grand Prix